Red Corral is a census-designated place in Amador County, California. Red Corral sits at an elevation of 2710 feet (826 m). The 2010 United States census reported Red Corral's population was 1,413.

Demographics
The 2010 United States Census reported that Red Corral had a population of 1,413. The racial makeup of Red Corral was 1,259 (89.1%) White, 24 (1.7%) African American, 15 (1.1%) Native American, 12 (0.8%) Asian, 3 (0.2%) Pacific Islander, 33 (2.3%) from other races, and 67 (4.7%) from two or more races. Hispanic or Latino of any race were 147 persons (10.4%).

The Census reported that 1,349 people (95.5% of the population) lived in households, 2 (0.1%) lived in non-institutionalized group quarters, and 62 (4.4%) were institutionalized.

There were 573 households, out of which 144 (25.1%) had children under the age of 18 living in them, 323 (56.4%) were opposite-sex married couples living together, 47 (8.2%) had a female householder with no husband present, 32 (5.6%) had a male householder with no wife present.  There were 42 (7.3%) unmarried opposite-sex partnerships, and 7 (1.2%) same-sex married couples or partnerships. 129 households (22.5%) were made up of individuals, and 51 (8.9%) had someone living alone who was 65 years of age or older. The average household size was 2.35.  There were 402 families (70.2% of all households); the average family size was 2.67.

The population was spread out, with 247 people (17.5%) under the age of 18, 131 people (9.3%) aged 18 to 24, 239 people (16.9%) aged 25 to 44, 499 people (35.3%) aged 45 to 64, and 297 people (21.0%) who were 65 years of age or older.  The median age was 48.9 years. For every 100 females, there were 106.9 males.  For every 100 females age 18 and over, there were 110.1 males.

The homeowner vacancy rate was 1.7%; the rental vacancy rate was 8.0%.  1,060 people (75.0% of the population) lived in owner-occupied housing units and 289 people (20.5%) lived in rental housing units.

References

Census-designated places in Amador County, California
Census-designated places in California